Jamaica is an island country situated in the Caribbean Sea. Spanning  in area, it is the third largest after Cuba and of the Greater Antilles and the Caribbean.

Originally inhabited by the indigenous Taíno peoples, the island came under Spanish rule following the arrival of Christopher Columbus in 1494. Many of the indigenous people either were killed or died of diseases, after which the Spanish brought large numbers of African slaves to Jamaica as labourers. The island remained a possession of Spain until 1655, when England (later Great Britain) conquered it, renaming it Jamaica. Under British colonial rule Jamaica became a leading sugar exporter, with a plantation economy dependent on the African slaves and later their descendants. The British fully emancipated all slaves in 1838, and many freedmen chose to have subsistence farms rather than to work on plantations. Beginning in the 1840s, the British began using Chinese and Indian indentured labour to work on plantations. The island achieved independence from the United Kingdom on 6 August 1962.

With  million people, Jamaica is the third-most populous Anglophone country in the Americas (after the United States and Canada), and the fourth-most populous country in the Caribbean. Kingston is the country's capital and largest city. The majority of Jamaicans are of Sub-Saharan African ancestry, with significant European, East Asian (primarily Chinese), Indian, Lebanese, and mixed-race minorities. Due to a high rate of emigration for work since the 1960s, there is a large Jamaican diaspora, particularly in Canada, the United Kingdom, and the United States. The country has a global influence that belies its small size; it was the birthplace of the Rastafari religion, reggae music (and associated genres such as dub, ska and dancehall), and it is internationally prominent in sports, most notably cricket, sprinting and athletics. Jamaica is often considered the world's least populous cultural superpower.

Jamaica is an upper-middle income country with an economy heavily dependent on tourism; it has an average of 4.3 million tourists a year. Jamaica performs favourably in measurements of press freedom and democratic governance. Politically it is a Commonwealth realm, with Charles III as its king. His appointed representative in the country is the Governor-General of Jamaica, an office held by Patrick Allen since 2009. Andrew Holness has served as Prime Minister of Jamaica since March 2016. Jamaica is a parliamentary constitutional monarchy with legislative power vested in the bicameral Parliament of Jamaica, consisting of an appointed Senate and a directly elected House of Representatives.

Etymology
The indigenous people, the Taíno, called the island Xaymaca in their language, meaning the "Land of Wood and Water" or the "Land of Springs". Yamaye has been suggested as an early Taino name for the island as recorded by Christopher Columbus.

Colloquially, Jamaicans refer to their home island as the "Rock". Slang names such as "Jamrock", "Jamdown" ("Jamdung" in Jamaican Patois), or briefly "Ja", have derived from this.

History

Prehistory

Humans have inhabited Jamaica from as early as 4000–1000 BC. Little is known of these early peoples. Another group, known as the "Redware people" after their pottery, arrived circa 600 AD, followed by the Taíno circa 800 AD, who most likely came from South America. They practised an agrarian and fishing economy, and at their height are thought to have numbered some 60,000 people, grouped into around 200 villages headed by caciques (chiefs). The south coast of Jamaica was the most populated, especially around the area now known as Old Harbour.

Though often thought to have become extinct following contact with Europeans, the Taíno in fact still inhabited Jamaica when the English took control of the island in 1655. Some fled into interior regions, merging with African Maroon communities. The Jamaican National Heritage Trust is attempting to locate and document any remaining evidence of the Taíno.

Spanish rule (1509–1655)

Christopher Columbus was the first European to see Jamaica, claiming the island for Spain after landing there in 1494 on his second voyage to the Americas. His probable landing point was Dry Harbour, called Discovery Bay, and St. Ann's Bay was named "Saint Gloria" by Columbus, as the first sighting of the land. He later returned in 1503; however, he was shipwrecked and he and his crew were forced to live on Jamaica for a year while waiting to be rescued.

One and a half kilometres west of St. Ann's Bay is the site of the first Spanish settlement on the island, Sevilla, which was established in 1509 by Juan de Esquivel but abandoned around 1524 because it was deemed unhealthy. The capital was moved to Spanish Town, then called St. Jago de la Vega, around 1534 (at present-day St. Catherine). Meanwhile, the Taínos began dying in large numbers, both from introduced diseases and from enslavement by the Spanish. As a result, the Spanish began importing slaves from Africa to the island.

Many slaves managed to escape, forming autonomous communities in remote and easily defended areas in the interior of Jamaica, mixing with the remaining Taino; these communities became known as Maroons. Many Jews fled the Spanish Inquisition to live on the island. They lived as conversos and were often persecuted by the Spanish rulers, and some turned to piracy against the Spanish Empire's shipping.

By the early 17th century it is estimated that no more than 2,500–3,000 people lived on Jamaica.

Early British period

The English began taking an interest in the island and, following a failed attempt to conquer Santo Domingo on Hispaniola, Admiral William Penn and General Robert Venables led an invasion of Jamaica in 1655. Battles at Ocho Rios in 1657 and the Rio Nuevo in 1658 resulted in Spanish defeats; in 1660 the Maroon community under the leadership of Juan de Bolas switched sides from the Spanish, and began supporting the English. With their help, the Spanish defeat was secured.

When the English captured Jamaica, most Spanish colonists fled, with the exception of Spanish Jews, who chose to remain on the island. Spanish slave holders freed their slaves before leaving Jamaica. Many slaves dispersed into the mountains, joining the already established maroon communities. During the centuries of slavery, Jamaican Maroons established free communities in the mountainous interior of Jamaica, where they maintained their freedom and independence for generations, under the leadership of Maroon leaders such as Juan de Serras.

Meanwhile, the Spanish made several attempts to re-capture the island, prompting the British to support pirates attacking Spanish ships in the Caribbean; as a result piracy became rampant on Jamaica, with the city of Port Royal becoming notorious for its lawlessness. Spain later recognised English possession of the island with the Treaty of Madrid (1670). After that, the English authorities sought to rein in the worst excesses of the pirates.

In 1660, the population of Jamaica was about 4,500 white and 1,500 black. By the early 1670s, as the English developed sugar cane plantations worked by large numbers of slaves, black Africans formed a majority of the population. The Irish in Jamaica also formed a large part of the island's early population, making up two-thirds of the white population on the island in the late 17th century, twice that of the English population. They were brought in as indentured labourers and soldiers after the conquest of 1655. The majority of Irish were transported by force as political prisoners of war from Ireland as a result of the ongoing Wars of the Three Kingdoms. Migration of large numbers of Irish to the island continued into the 18th century.

A limited form of local government was introduced with the creation of the House of Assembly of Jamaica in 1664; however, it represented only a tiny number of rich plantation owners. In 1692, the colony was rocked by an earthquake that resulted in several thousand deaths and the almost complete destruction of Port Royal.

18th–19th centuries

During the 1700s the economy boomed, based largely on sugar and other crops for export such as coffee, cotton and indigo. All these crops were worked by black slaves, who lived short and often brutal lives with no rights, being the property of a small planter-class. In the 18th century, slaves ran away and joined the Maroons in increasing numbers, and resulted in The First Maroon War (1728 – 1739/40), which ended in stalemate. The British government sued for peace, and signed treaties with the Leeward Maroons led by Cudjoe and Accompong in 1739, and the Windward Maroons led by Quao and Queen Nanny in 1740.

A large slave rebellion, known as Tacky's War, broke out in 1760 but was defeated by the British and their Maroon allies. After the second conflict in 1795–96, many Maroons from the Maroon town of Cudjoe's Town (Trelawny Town) were expelled to Nova Scotia and, later, Sierra Leone. Many slaves ran away and formed independent communities under the leadership of escaped slaves such as Three-Fingered Jack, Cuffee and at Me-no-Sen-You-no-Come.

By the beginning of the 19th century, Jamaica's dependence on slave labour and a plantation economy had resulted in black people outnumbering white people by a ratio of almost 20 to 1. Although the British had outlawed the importation of slaves, some were still smuggled in from Spanish colonies and directly from Africa. While planning the abolition of slavery, the British Parliament passed laws to improve conditions for slaves. They banned the use of whips in the field and flogging of women; informed planters that slaves were to be allowed religious instruction, and required a free day during each week when slaves could sell their produce, prohibiting Sunday markets to enable slaves to attend church. The House of Assembly in Jamaica resented and resisted the new laws. Members, with membership then restricted to European-descended Jamaicans, claimed that the slaves were content and objected to Parliament's interference in island affairs. Slave owners feared possible revolts if conditions were lightened.

The British abolished the slave trade in 1807, but not the institution itself. In 1831 a huge slave rebellion, known as the Baptist War, broke out, led by the Baptist preacher Samuel Sharpe. The rebellion resulted in hundreds of deaths and the destruction of many plantations, and led to ferocious reprisals by the plantocracy class. As a result of rebellions such as these, as well as the efforts of abolitionists, Britain outlawed slavery in its empire in 1834, with full emancipation from chattel slavery declared in 1838. The population in 1834 was 371,070, of whom 15,000 were white, 5,000 free black; 40,000 "coloured" or free people of colour (mixed race); and 311,070 were slaves. The resulting labour shortage prompted the British to begin to "import" indentured servants to supplement the labour pool, as many freedmen resisted working on the plantations. Workers recruited from India began arriving in 1845, Chinese workers in 1854. Many South Asian and Chinese descendants continue to reside in Jamaica today.

Over the next 20 years, several epidemics of cholera, scarlet fever, and smallpox hit the island, killing almost 60,000 people (about 10 per day). Nevertheless, in 1871 the census recorded a population of 506,154 people, 246,573 of which were males, and 259,581 females. Their races were recorded as 13,101 white, 100,346 coloured (mixed black and white), and 392,707 black. This period was marked by an economic slump, with many Jamaicans living in poverty. Dissatisfaction with this, and continued racial discrimination and marginalisation of the black majority, led to the outbreak of the Morant Bay rebellion in 1865 led by Paul Bogle, which was put down by Governor John Eyre with such brutality that he was recalled from his position. His successor, John Peter Grant, enacted a series of social, financial and political reforms whilst aiming to uphold firm British rule over the island, which became a Crown Colony in 1866. In 1872 the capital was transferred from Spanish Town to Kingston.

Early 20th century

In 1907 Jamaica was struck by an earthquake—this, and the subsequent fire, caused immense destruction in Kingston and the deaths of 800–1,000 people.

Unemployment and poverty remained a problem for many Jamaicans. Various movements seeking political change arose as a result, most notably the Universal Negro Improvement Association and African Communities League founded by Marcus Garvey in 1917. As well as seeking greater political rights and an improvement for the condition of workers, Garvey was also a prominent Pan-Africanist and proponent of the Back-to-Africa movement. He was also one of the chief inspirations behind Rastafari, a religion founded in Jamaica in the 1930s that combined Christianity with an Afrocentric theology focused on the figure of Haile Selassie, Emperor of Ethiopia. Despite occasional persecution, Rastafari grew to become an established faith on the island, later spreading abroad.

The Great Depression of the 1930s hit Jamaica hard. As part of the British West Indian labour unrest of 1934–39, Jamaica saw numerous strikes, culminating in a strike in 1938 that turned into a full-blown riot.
As a result, the British government instituted a commission to look into the causes of the disturbances; their report recommended political and economic reforms in Britain's Caribbean colonies. A new House of Representatives was established in 1944, elected by universal adult suffrage. During this period Jamaica's two-party system emerged, with the creation of the Jamaican Labour Party (JLP) under Alexander Bustamante and the People's National Party (PNP) under Norman Manley.

Jamaica slowly gained increasing autonomy from the United Kingdom. In 1958 it became a province in the Federation of the West Indies, a federation of several of Britain's Caribbean colonies. Membership of the Federation proved to be divisive, however, and a referendum on the issue saw a slight majority voting to leave. After leaving the Federation, Jamaica attained full independence on 6 August 1962. The new state retained, however, its membership in the Commonwealth of Nations (with the British monarch as head of state) and adopted a Westminster-style parliamentary system. Bustamante, at the age of 78, became the country's first prime minister.

Post-independence era

Strong economic growth, averaging approximately 6% per annum, marked the first ten years of independence under conservative JLP governments; these were led by successive Prime Ministers Alexander Bustamante, Donald Sangster (who died of natural causes within two months of taking office) and Hugh Shearer. The growth was fuelled by high levels of private investment in bauxite/alumina, tourism, the manufacturing industry and, to a lesser extent, the agricultural sector. In the 1967 Jamaican general election, the JLP were victorious again, winning 33 out of 53 seats, with the PNP taking 20 seats.

In terms of foreign policy Jamaica became a member of the Non-Aligned Movement, seeking to retain strong ties with Britain and the United States whilst also developing links with Communist states such as Cuba.

The optimism of the first decade was accompanied by a growing sense of inequality among many Afro-Jamaicans, and a concern that the benefits of growth were not being shared by the urban poor, many of whom ended up living in crime-ridden shanty towns in Kingston. This, combined with the effects of a slowdown in the global economy in 1970, led to the voters electing the PNP under Michael Manley in 1972. The PNP won 37 seats to the JLP's 16.

Manley's government enacted various social reforms, such as a higher minimum wage, land reform, legislation for women's equality, greater housing construction and an increase in educational provision. Internationally he improved ties with the Communist bloc and vigorously opposed the apartheid regime in South Africa.

In 1976, the PNP won another landslide, winning 47 seats to the JLP's 13. The turnout was a very high 85 percent. However, the economy faltered in this period due to a combination of internal and external factors (such as the oil shocks). The rivalry between the JLP and PNP became intense, and political and gang-related violence grew significantly in this period.

By 1980, Jamaica's gross national product had declined to some 25% below its 1972 level. Seeking change, Jamaicans voted the JLP back in in 1980 under Edward Seaga, the JLP winning 51 seats to the PNP's nine seats. Firmly anti-Communist, Seaga cut ties with Cuba and sent troops to support the US invasion of Grenada in 1983. The economic deterioration, however, continued into the mid-1980s, exacerbated by a number of factors. The largest and third-largest alumina producers, Alpart and Alcoa, closed; and there was a significant reduction in production by the second-largest producer, Alcan. Reynolds Jamaica Mines, Ltd. left the Jamaican industry. There was also a decline in tourism, which was important to the economy. Owing to rising foreign and local debt, accompanied by large fiscal deficits, the government sought International Monetary Fund (IMF) financing, which was dependent on implementing various austerity measures. These resulted in strikes in 1985 and a decline in support for the Seaga government, exacerbated by criticism of the government's response to the devastation caused by Hurricane Gilbert in 1988. Having now de-emphasised socialism and adopting a more centrist position, Michael Manley and the PNP were re-elected in 1989, winning 45 seats to the JLP's 15.

The PNP went on to win a string of elections, under Prime Ministers Michael Manley (1989–1992), P. J. Patterson (1992–2005) and Portia Simpson-Miller (2005–2007). In the 1993 Jamaican general election, Patterson led the PNP to victory, winning 52 seats to the JLP's eight seats. Patterson also won the 1997 Jamaican general election, by another landslide margin of 50 seats to the JLP's 10 seats. Patterson's third consecutive victory came in the 2002 Jamaican general election, when the PNP retained power, but with a reduced seat majority of 34 seats to 26. Patterson stepped down on 26 February 2006, and was replaced by Portia Simpson-Miller, Jamaica's first female Prime Minister. The turnout slowly declined during this period of time, from 67.4% in 1993 to 59.1% in 2002.

During this period various economic reforms were introduced, such as deregulating the finance sector and floating the Jamaican dollar, as well as greater investment in infrastructure, whilst also retaining a strong social safety net. Political violence, so prevalent in the previous two decades, declined significantly.

In 2007 the PNP was defeated by the JLP by a narrow margin of 32 seats to 28, with a turnout of 61.46%. This election ended 18 years of PNP rule, and Bruce Golding became the new prime minister. Golding's tenure (2007–2010) was dominated by the effects of the global recession, as well as the fallout from an attempt by Jamaican police and military to arrest drug lord Christopher Coke in 2010 which erupted in violence, resulting in over 70 deaths. As a result of this incident Golding resigned and was replaced by Andrew Holness in 2011.

Independence, however widely celebrated in Jamaica, has been questioned in the early 21st century. In 2011, a survey showed that approximately 60% of Jamaicans believe that the country would have been better off had it remained a British colony, with only 17% believing it would have been worse off, citing as problems years of social and fiscal mismanagement in the country. However, this poll reflected a greater discontent with the JLP handling of crime and the economy, and as a result, Holness and the JLP were defeated in the 2011 Jamaican general election, which saw Portia Simpson-Miller and the PNP return to power. The number of seats had been increased to 63, and the PNP swept to power with a landslide 42 seats to the JLP's 21. The voter turnout was 53.17%.

Holness's JLP won the 2016 general election narrowly, defeating Simpson-Miller's PNP, on 25 February. The PNP won 31 seats to the JLP's 32. As a result, Simpson-Miller became Opposition Leader for a second time. The voter turnout dipped below 50% for the first time, registering just 48.37%.

In the 2020 general election, Andrew Holness made history for the JLP by accomplishing a second consecutive win for the Jamaica Labour Party, winning 49 seats to 14 won by the PNP, led this time by Peter Phillips. The last time a consecutive win occurred for the JLP was in 1980. However, the turnout at this election was just 37%, probably affected by the coronavirus pandemic.

Government and politics

Jamaica is a parliamentary democracy and constitutional monarchy. The head of state is the King of Jamaica (currently King Charles III), represented locally by the Governor-General of Jamaica. The governor-general is nominated by the Prime Minister of Jamaica and the entire Cabinet and then formally appointed by the monarch. All the members of the Cabinet are appointed by the governor-general on the advice of the prime minister. The monarch and the governor-general serve largely ceremonial roles, apart from their reserve powers for use in certain constitutional crisis situations. The position of the monarch has been a matter of continuing debate in Jamaica for many years; currently both major political parties are committed to transitioning to a republic with a president.

Jamaica's current constitution was drafted in 1962 by a bipartisan joint committee of the Jamaican legislature. It came into force with the Jamaica Independence Act, 1962, which was passed by the Parliament of the United Kingdom, which gave Jamaica independence.

The Parliament of Jamaica is bicameral, consisting of the House of Representatives (Lower House) and the Senate (Upper House). Members of the House (known as Members of Parliament or MPs) are directly elected, and the member of the House of Representatives who, in the governor-general's best judgement, is best able to command the confidence of a majority of the members of that House, is appointed by the governor-general to be the prime minister. Senators are nominated jointly by the prime minister and the parliamentary Leader of the Opposition and are then appointed by the governor-general.

The Judiciary of Jamaica operates on a common law system derived from English law and Commonwealth of Nations precedents. The court of final appeal is the Judicial Committee of the Privy Council, though during the 2000s Parliament attempted to replace it with the Caribbean Court of Justice.

Political parties and elections
Jamaica has traditionally had a two-party system, with power often alternating between the People's National Party (PNP) and Jamaica Labour Party (JLP). The party with current administrative and legislative power is the Jamaica Labour Party, after its 2020 victory. There are also several minor parties who have yet to gain a seat in parliament; the largest of these is the National Democratic Movement (NDM).

Military

The Jamaica Defence Force (JDF) is the small but professional military force of Jamaica. The JDF is based on the British military model with similar organisation, training, weapons and traditions. Once chosen, officer candidates are sent to one of several British or Canadian basic officer courses depending on the arm of service. Enlisted soldiers are given basic training at Up Park Camp or JDF Training Depot, Newcastle, both in St. Andrew. As with the British model, NCOs are given several levels of professional training as they rise up the ranks. Additional military schools are available for speciality training in Canada, the United States and the United Kingdom.

The JDF is directly descended from the British Army's West India Regiment, which was formed during the colonial era. The West India Regiment was used extensively throughout the British Empire in policing the empire from 1795 to 1926. Other units in the JDF heritage include the early colonial Jamaica Militia, the Kingston Infantry Volunteers of WWI and reorganised into the Jamaican Infantry Volunteers in World War II. The West Indies Regiment was reformed in 1958 as part of the West Indies Federation, after dissolution of the Federation the JDF was established.

The Jamaica Defence Force (JDF) comprises an infantry Regiment and Reserve Corps, an Air Wing, a Coast Guard fleet and a supporting Engineering Unit. The infantry regiment contains the 1st, 2nd and 3rd (National Reserve) battalions. The JDF Air Wing is divided into three flight units, a training unit, a support unit and the JDF Air Wing (National Reserve). The Coast Guard is divided between seagoing crews and support crews who conduct maritime safety and maritime law enforcement as well as defence-related operations.

The role of the support battalion is to provide support to boost numbers in combat and issue competency training in order to allow for the readiness of the force. The 1st Engineer Regiment was formed due to an increased demand for military engineers and their role is to provide engineering services whenever and wherever they are needed. The Headquarters JDF contains the JDF Commander, Command Staff as well as Intelligence, Judge Advocate office, Administrative and Procurement sections.

In recent years the JDF has been called on to assist the nation's police, the Jamaica Constabulary Force (JCF), in fighting drug smuggling and a rising crime rate which includes one of the highest murder rates in the world. JDF units actively conduct armed patrols with the JCF in high-crime areas and known gang neighbourhoods. There has been vocal controversy as well as support of this JDF role. In early 2005, an Opposition leader, Edward Seaga, called for the merger of the JDF and JCF. This has not garnered support in either organisation nor among the majority of citizens. In 2017, Jamaica signed the UN treaty on the Prohibition of Nuclear Weapons.

Administrative divisions

Jamaica is divided into 14 parishes, which are grouped into three historic counties that have no administrative relevance.

In the context of local government the parishes are designated "Local Authorities". These local authorities are further styled as "Municipal Corporations", which are either city municipalities or town municipalities. Any new city municipality must have a population of at least 50,000, and a town municipality a number set by the Minister of Local Government. There are currently no town municipalities.

The local governments of the parishes of Kingston and St. Andrews are consolidated as the city municipality of Kingston & St. Andrew Municipal Corporation. The newest city municipality created is the Municipality of Portmore in 2003. While it is geographically located within the parish of St. Catherine, it is governed independently.

Geography and environment

Jamaica is the third largest island in the Caribbean. It lies between latitudes 17° and 19°N, and longitudes 76° and 79°W. Mountains dominate the interior: the Don Figuerero, Santa Cruz, and May Day mountains in the west, the Dry Harbour Mountains in the centre, and the John Crow Mountains and Blue Mountains in the east, the latter containing Blue Mountain Peak, Jamaica's tallest mountain at 2,256 m. They are surrounded by a narrow coastal plain. Jamaica has two cities, the first being Kingston, the capital city and centre of business, located on the south coast and the second being Montego Bay, one of the best known cities in the Caribbean for tourism, located on the north coast. Kingston Harbour is the seventh-largest natural harbour in the world, which contributed to the city being designated as the capital in 1872. Other towns of note include Portmore, Spanish Town, Savanna la Mar, Mandeville and the resort towns of Ocho Ríos, Port Antonio and Negril.

Tourist attractions include Dunn's River Falls in St. Ann, YS Falls in St. Elizabeth, the Blue Lagoon in Portland, a dormant volcano's crater, and Port Royal, site of a major earthquake in 1692 that helped form the island's Palisadoes tombolo.

Among the variety of terrestrial, aquatic and marine ecosystems are dry and wet limestone forests, rainforest, riparian woodland, wetlands, caves, rivers, seagrass beds and coral reefs. The authorities have recognised the tremendous significance and potential of the environment and have designated some of the more "fertile" areas as "protected". Among the island's protected areas are the Cockpit Country, Hellshire Hills, and Litchfield forest reserves. Portland Bight Protected Area was designated in 1999.

There are several small islands off Jamaica's coast, most notably those in Portland Bight such as Pigeon Island, Salt Island, Dolphin Island, Long Island, Great Goat Island and Little Goat Island, and also Lime Cay located further east. Much further out – some 50–80 km off the south coast – lie the very small Morant Cays and Pedro Cays.

Climate
The climate in Jamaica is tropical, with hot and humid weather, although higher inland regions are more temperate. Some regions on the south coast, such as the Liguanea Plain and the Pedro Plains, are relatively dry rain-shadow areas.

Jamaica lies in the hurricane belt of the Atlantic Ocean and because of this, the island sometimes suffers significant storm damage. Hurricanes Charlie and Gilbert hit Jamaica directly in 1951 and 1988, respectively, causing major damage and many deaths. In the 2000s (decade), hurricanes Ivan, Dean, and Gustav also brought severe weather to the island.

Flora and fauna

Jamaica's climate is tropical, supporting diverse ecosystems with a wealth of plants and animals. Its plant life has changed considerably over the centuries; when the Spanish arrived in 1494, except for small agricultural clearings, the country was deeply forested. The European settlers cut down the great timber trees for building and ships' supplies, and cleared the plains, savannas, and mountain slopes for intense agricultural cultivation. Many new plants were introduced including sugarcane, bananas, and citrus trees.

Jamaica is home to about 3,000 species of native flowering plants (of which over 1,000 are endemic and 200 are species of orchid), thousands of species of non-flowering flora, and about 20 botanical gardens, some of which are several hundred years old. Areas of heavy rainfall also contain stands of bamboo, ferns, ebony, mahogany, and rosewood. Cactus and similar dry-area plants are found along the south and southwest coastal area. Parts of the west and southwest consist of large grasslands, with scattered stands of trees. Jamaica is home to three terrestrial ecoregions, the Jamaican moist forests, Jamaican dry forests, and Greater Antilles mangroves. It had a 2019 Forest Landscape Integrity Index mean score of 5.01/10, ranking it 110th globally out of 172 countries.

Jamaica's fauna, typical of the Caribbean, includes highly diversified wildlife with many endemic species. As with other oceanic islands, land mammals are mostly several species of bats of which at least three endemic species are found only in Cockpit Country, one of which is at-risk. Other species of bat include the fig-eating and hairy-tailed bats. The only non-bat native mammal extant in Jamaica is the Jamaican hutia, locally known as the coney. Introduced mammals such as wild boar and the small Asian mongoose are also common. Jamaica is also home to about 50 species of reptiles, the largest of which is the American crocodile; however, it is only present within the Black River and a few other areas. Lizards such as anoles, iguanas and snakes such as racers and the Jamaican boa (the largest snake on the island), are common in areas such as the Cockpit Country. None of Jamaica's eight species of native snakes is venomous.

Jamaica is home to about 289 species of birds of which 27 are endemic including the endangered black-Billed parrots and the Jamaican blackbird, both of which are only found in Cockpit Country. It is also the indigenous home to four species of hummingbirds (three of which are found nowhere else in the world): the black-billed streamertail, the Jamaican mango, the Vervain hummingbird, and red-billed streamertails. The red-billed streamertail, known locally as the "doctor bird", is Jamaica's National Symbol. Other notable species include the Jamaican tody and the Greater flamingo,

One species of freshwater turtle is native to Jamaica, the Jamaican slider. It is found only on Jamaica and on a few islands in the Bahamas. In addition, many types of frogs are common on the island, especially treefrogs.

Jamaican waters contain considerable resources of fresh and saltwater fish. The chief varieties of saltwater fish are kingfish, jack, mackerel, whiting, bonito, and tuna. Fish that occasionally enter freshwater and estuarine environments include snook, jewfish, mangrove snapper, and mullets. Fish that spend the majority of their lives in Jamaica's fresh waters include many species of livebearers, killifish, freshwater gobies, the mountain mullet, and the American eel. Tilapia have been introduced from Africa for aquaculture, and are very common. Also visible in the waters surrounding Jamaica are dolphins, parrotfish, and the endangered manatee.

Insects and other invertebrates are abundant, including the world's largest centipede, the Amazonian giant centipede. Jamaica is the home to about 150 species of butterflies and moths, including 35 indigenous species and 22 subspecies. It is also the native home to the Jamaican swallowtail, the western hemisphere's largest butterfly.

Aquatic life 
Coral reef ecosystems are important because they provide people with a source of livelihood, food, recreation, and medicinal compounds and protect the land on which they live. Jamaica relies on the ocean and its ecosystem for its development. However, the marine life in Jamaica is also being affected. There could be many factors that contribute to marine life not having the best health. Jamaica's geological origin, topographical features and seasonal high rainfall make it susceptible to a range of natural hazards that can affect the coastal and oceanic environments. These include storm surge, slope failures (landslides), earthquakes, floods and hurricanes. Coral reefs in the Negril Marine Park (NMP), Jamaica, have been increasingly impacted by nutrient pollution and macroalgal blooms following decades of intensive development as a major tourist destination. Another one of those factors could include tourism: being that Jamaica is a very touristy place, the island draws numerous people traveling here from all over the world. The Jamaican tourism industry accounts for 32% of total employment and 36% of the country's GDP and is largely based on the sun, sea and sand, the last two of these attributes being dependent on healthy coral reef ecosystems. Because of Jamaica's tourism, they have developed a study to see if the tourist would be willing to help financially to manage their marine ecosystem because Jamaica alone is unable to. The ocean connects all the countries all over the world, however, everyone and everything is affecting the flow and life in the ocean. Jamaica is a very touristy place specifically because of their beaches. If their oceans are not functioning at their best then the well-being of Jamaica and the people who live there will start to deteriorate. According to the OECD, oceans contribute $1.5 trillion annually in value-added to the overall economy. A developing country on an island will get the majority of their revenue from their ocean.

Pollution 
Pollution comes from run-off, sewage systems, and garbage. However, this typically all ends up in the ocean after there is rain or floods. Everything that ends up in the water changes the quality and balance of the ocean. Poor coastal water quality has adversely affected fisheries, tourism and mariculture, as well as undermining biological sustainability of the living resources of ocean and coastal habitats. Jamaica imports and exports many goods through their waters. Some of the imports that go into Jamaica include petroleum and petroleum products. Issues include accidents at sea; risk of spills through local and international transport of petroleum and petroleum products. Oil spills can disrupt the marine life with chemicals that are not normally found in the ocean. Other forms of pollution also occur in Jamaica. Solid waste disposal mechanisms in Jamaica are currently inadequate. The solid waste gets into the water through rainfall forces. Solid waste is also harmful to wildlife, particularly birds, fish and turtles that feed at the surface of the water and mistake floating debris for food. For example, plastic can be caught around birds' and turtles' necks, making it difficult to eat and breath as they begin to grow, causing the plastic to get tighter around their necks. Pieces of plastic, metal, and glass can be mistaken for the food fish eat. Each Jamaican generates 1 kg (2 lbs) of waste per day; only 70% of this is collected by National Solid Waste Management Authority (NSWMA)—the remaining 30% is either burnt or disposed of in gullies/waterways.

Environmental policies 
There are policies that are being put into place to help preserve the ocean and the life below water. The goal of integrated coastal zone management (ICZM) is to improve the quality of life of human communities who depend on coastal resources while maintaining the biological diversity and productivity of coastal ecosystems. Developing an underdeveloped country can impact the oceans ecosystem because of all the construction that would be done to develop the country. Over-building, driven by powerful market forces as well as poverty among some sectors of the population, and destructive exploitation contribute to the decline of ocean and coastal resources. Developing practices that will contribute to the lives of the people but also to the life of the ocean and its ecosystem. Some of these practices include: Develop sustainable fisheries practices, ensure sustainable mariculture techniques and practices, sustainable management of shipping, and promote sustainable tourism practices. As for tourism, tourism is the number one source of foreign exchange earnings in Jamaica and, as such is vital to the national economy. Tourist typically go to countries unaware of issues and how they impact those issues. Tourist are not going to be used to living in a different style compared to their own country. Practices such as: provide sewage treatment facilities for all tourist areas, determine carrying capacity of the environment prior to planning tourism activities, provide alternative types of tourist activities can help to get desired results such as the development of alternative tourism which will reduce the current pressure on resources that support traditional tourism activities. A study was conducted to see how tourist could help with sustainable financing for ocean and coastal management in Jamaica. Instead of using tourist fees they would call them environmental fees. This study aims to inform the relevant stakeholders of the feasibility of implementing environmental fees as well as the likely impact of such revenue generating instruments on the current tourist visitation rates to the island. The development of a user fee system would help fund environmental management and protection. The results show that tourists have a high consumer surplus associated with a vacation in Jamaica, and have a significantly lower willingness to pay for a tourism tax when compared to an environmental tax. The findings of the study show that the "label" of the tax and as well as the respondent's awareness of the institutional mechanisms for environmental protection and tourism are important to their decision framework. Tourist are more willing to pay for environmental fees rather than tourist tax fees. A tax high enough to fund for environmental management and protection but low enough to continue to bring tourist to Jamaica. It has been shown that if an environmental tax of $1 per person were introduced it would not cause a significant decline in visitation rates and would generate revenues of US$1.7M per year.

Demographics

Ethnic origins

C.I.A. World Fact Book 2015

Jamaica's diverse ethnic roots are reflected in the national motto "Out of Many One People". Most of the population of 2,812,000 (July 2018 est.) are of African or partially African descent, with many being able to trace their origins to the West African countries of Ghana and Nigeria. Other major ancestral areas are Europe, South Asia, and East Asia. It is uncommon for Jamaicans to identify themselves by race as is prominent in other countries such as the United States, with most Jamaicans seeing Jamaican nationality as an identity in and of itself, identifying as simply being "Jamaican" regardless of ethnicity. A study found that the average admixture on the island was 78.3% Sub-Saharan African, 16.0% European, and 5.7% East Asian. Another study in 2020 showed that Jamaicans of African descent represent 76.3% of the population, followed by 15.1% Afro-European, 3.4% East Indian and Afro-East Indian, 3.2% Caucasian, 1.2% Chinese and 0.8% other.

The Jamaican Maroons of Accompong and other settlements are the descendants of African slaves who fled the plantations for the interior where they set up their own autonomous communities. Many Maroons continue to have their own traditions and speak their own language, known locally as Kromanti.

Asians form the second-largest group and include Indo-Jamaicans and Chinese Jamaicans. Most are descended from indentured workers brought by the British colonial government to fill labour shortages following the abolition of slavery in 1838. Prominent Indian Jamaicans include jockey Shaun Bridgmohan, who was the first Jamaican in the Kentucky Derby, NBC Nightly News journalist Lester Holt, and Miss Jamaica World and Miss Universe winner Yendi Phillips. The southwestern parish of Westmoreland is famous for its large population of Indo-Jamaicans. Along with their Indian counterparts, Chinese Jamaicans have also played an integral part in Jamaica's community and history. Prominent descendants of this group include Canadian billionaire investor Michael Lee-Chin, supermodels Naomi Campbell and Tyson Beckford, and VP Records founder Vincent "Randy" Chin.

There are about 20,000 Jamaicans who have Lebanese and Syrian ancestry. Most were Christian immigrants who fled the Ottoman occupation of Lebanon in the early 19th century. Eventually their descendants became very successful politicians and businessmen. Notable Jamaicans from this group include former Jamaican Prime Minister Edward Seaga, Jamaican politician and former Miss World Lisa Hanna, Jamaican politicians Edward Zacca and Shahine Robinson, and hotelier Abraham Elias Issa.

In 1835, Charles Ellis, 1st Baron Seaford gave 500 acres of his 10,000 acre estate in Westmoreland for the Seaford Town German settlement. Today most of the town's descendants are of full or partial German descent.

The first wave of English immigrants arrived to the island 1655 after conquering the Spanish, and they have historically been the dominant group. Prominent descendants from this group include former American Governor of New York David Paterson, Sandals Hotels owner Gordon Butch Stewart, United States Presidential Advisor and "mother" of the Pell Grant Lois Rice, and former United States National Security Advisor and Ambassador to the United Nations Susan Rice. The first Irish immigrants came to Jamaica in the 1600s as war prisoners and later, indentured labour. Their descendants include two of Jamaica's National Heroes: Prime Ministers Michael Manley and Alexander Bustamante. Along with the English and the Irish, the Scots are another group that has made a significant impact on the island. According to the Scotland Herald newspaper, Jamaica has more people using the Campbell surnames than the population of Scotland itself, and it also has the highest percentage of Scottish surnames outside of Scotland. Scottish surnames account to about 60% of the surnames in the Jamaican phone books. The first Jamaican inhabitants from Scotland were exiled "rebels". Later, they would be followed by ambitious businessmen who spent time between their great country estates in Scotland and the island. As a result, many of the slave owning plantations on the island were owned by Scottish men, and thus a large number of mixed-race Jamaicans can claim Scottish ancestry. High immigration from Scotland continued until well after independence. Today, notable Scottish-Jamaicans include the businessman John Pringle, former American Secretary of State Colin Powell, and American actress Kerry Washington.

There is also a significant Portuguese Jamaican population that is predominantly of Sephardic Jewish heritage. The first Jews arrived as explorers from Spain in the 15th century after being forced to convert to Christianity or face death. A small number of them became slave owners and even famous pirates. Judaism eventually became very influential in Jamaica and can be seen today with many Jewish cemeteries around the country. During the Holocaust Jamaica became a refuge for Jews fleeing persecution in Europe. Famous Jewish descendants include the dancehall artist Sean Paul, former record producer and founder of Island Records Chris Blackwell, and Jacob De Cordova who was the founder of the Daily Gleaner newspaper.

In recent years immigration has increased, coming mainly from China, Haiti, Cuba, Colombia, and Latin America; 20,000 Latin Americans reside in Jamaica. In 2016, the Prime Minister Andrew Holness suggested making Spanish Jamaica's second official language. About 7,000 Americans also reside in Jamaica. Notable American with connection to the island include fashion icon Ralph Lauren, philanthropist Daisy Soros, Blackstone's Schwarzman family, the family of the late Lieutenant Governor of Delaware John W. Rollins, fashion designer Vanessa Noel, investor Guy Stuart, Edward and Patricia Falkenberg, and iHeart Media CEO Bob Pittman, all of whom hold annual charity events to support the island.

Languages

Jamaica is regarded as a bilingual country, with two major languages in use by the population. The official language is English, which is "used in all domains of public life", including the government, the legal system, the media, and education. However, the primary spoken language is an English-based creole called Jamaican Patois (or Patwa). The two exist in a dialect continuum, with speakers using a different register of speech depending on context and whom they are speaking to. "Pure" Patois, though sometimes seen as merely a particularly aberrant dialect of English, is essentially mutually unintelligible with standard English and is best thought of a separate language. A 2007 survey by the Jamaican Language Unit found that 17.1 percent of the population were monolingual in Jamaican Standard English (JSE), 36.5 percent were monolingual in Patois, and 46.4 percent were bilingual, although earlier surveys had pointed to a greater degree of bilinguality (up to 90 percent). The Jamaican education system has only recently begun to offer formal instruction in Patois, while retaining JSE as the "official language of instruction".

Additionally, some Jamaicans use one or more of Jamaican Sign Language (JSL), American Sign Language (ASL) or the declining indigenous Jamaican Country Sign Language (Konchri Sain). Both JSL and ASL are rapidly replacing Konchri Sain for a variety of reasons.

Emigration

Many Jamaicans have emigrated to other countries, especially to the United Kingdom, the United States, and Canada. In the case of the United States, about 20,000 Jamaicans per year are granted permanent residence. There has also been emigration of Jamaicans to other Caribbeans countries such as Cuba, Puerto Rico, Guyana, and The Bahamas. It was estimated in 2004 that up to 2.5 million Jamaicans and Jamaican descendants live abroad.

Jamaicans in the United Kingdom number an estimated 800,000 making them by far the country's largest African-Caribbean group. Large-scale migration from Jamaica to the UK occurred primarily in the 1950s and 1960s when the country was still under British rule. Jamaican communities exist in most large UK cities. Concentrations of expatriate Jamaicans are quite considerable in numerous cities in the United States, including New York City, Buffalo, the Miami metro area, Atlanta, Chicago, Orlando, Tampa, Washington, D.C., Philadelphia, Hartford, Providence and Los Angeles. In Canada, the Jamaican population is centred in Toronto, with smaller communities in cities such as Hamilton, Montreal, Winnipeg, Vancouver and Ottawa. Jamaican Canadians comprise about 30% of the entire Black Canadian population.

A notable though much smaller group of emigrants are Jamaicans in Ethiopia. These are mostly Rastafarians, in whose theological worldview Africa is the promised land, or "Zion", or more specifically Ethiopia, due to reverence in which former Ethiopian Emperor Haile Selassie is held. Most live in the small town of Shashamane about 150 miles (240 km) south of the capital Addis Ababa.

Crime

When Jamaica gained independence in 1962, the murder rate was 3.9 per 100,000 inhabitants, one of the lowest in the world. By 2009, the rate was 62 per 100,000 inhabitants, one of the highest in the world. Gang violence became a serious problem, with organised crime being centred around Jamaican posses or "Yardies". Jamaica has had one of the highest murder rates in the world for many years, according to UN estimates. Some areas of Jamaica, particularly poor areas in Kingston, Montego Bay and elsewhere experience high levels of crime and violence.

However, there were 1,682 reported murders in 2009 and 1,428 in 2010. After 2011 the murder rate continued to fall, following the downward trend in 2010, after a strategic programme was launched. In 2012, the Ministry of National Security reported a 30 percent decrease in murders. Nevertheless, in 2017 murders rose by 22% over the previous year.

Many Jamaicans are hostile towards LGBT and intersex people, and mob attacks against gay people have been reported. Numerous high-profile dancehall and ragga artists have produced songs featuring explicitly homophobic lyrics. Male homosexuality is illegal and punishable by imprisonment.

Major cities

Religion

Christianity is the largest religion practised in Jamaica. About 70% are Protestants; Roman Catholics are just 2% of the population. According to the 2001 census, the country's largest Protestant denominations are the Church of God (24%), Seventh-day Adventist Church (11%), Pentecostal (10%), Baptist (7%), Anglican (4%), United Church (2%), Methodist (2%), Moravian (1%) and Plymouth Brethren (1%). Bedwardism is a form of Christianity native to the island, sometime view as a separate faith. The Christian faith gained acceptance as British Christian abolitionists and Baptist missionaries joined educated former slaves in the struggle against slavery.

The Rastafari movement has 29,026 adherents, according to the 2011 census, with 25,325 Rastafarian males and 3,701 Rastafarian females. The faith originated in Jamaica in the 1930s and though rooted in Christianity it is heavily Afrocentric in its focus, revering figures such as the Jamaican black nationalist Marcus Garvey and Haile Selassie, the former Emperor of Ethiopia. Rastafari has since spread across the globe, especially to areas with large black or African diasporas.

Various faiths and traditional religious practices derived from Africa are practised on the island, notably Kumina, Convince, Myal and Obeah.

Other religions in Jamaica include Jehovah's Witnesses (2% population), the Bahá'í faith, which counts perhaps 8,000 adherents and 21 Local Spiritual Assemblies, Mormonism, Buddhism, and Hinduism. The Hindu Diwali festival is celebrated yearly among the Indo-Jamaican community.

There is also a small population of about 200 Jews, who describe themselves as Liberal-Conservative. The first Jews in Jamaica trace their roots back to early 15th-century Spain and Portugal. Kahal Kadosh Shaare Shalom, also known as the United Congregation of Israelites, is a historic synagogue located in the city of Kingston. Originally built in 1912, it is the official and only Jewish place of worship left on the island. The once abundant Jewish population has voluntarily converted to Christianity over time. Shaare Shalom is one of the few synagogues in the world that contains sand covered floors and is a popular tourist destination.

Other small groups include Muslims, who claim 5,000 adherents. The Muslim holidays of Ashura (known locally as Hussay or Hosay) and Eid have been celebrated throughout the island for hundreds of years. In the past, every plantation in each parish celebrated Hosay. Today it has been called an Indian carnival and is perhaps most well known in Clarendon where it is celebrated each August. People of all religions attend the event, showing mutual respect.

Culture

Music

Though a small nation, Jamaican culture has a strong global presence. The musical genres reggae, ska, mento, rocksteady, dub, and, more recently, dancehall and ragga all originated in the island's vibrant, popular urban recording industry. These have themselves gone on to influence numerous other genres, such as punk rock (through reggae and ska), dub poetry, New Wave, two-tone, lovers rock, reggaeton, jungle, drum and bass, dubstep, grime and American rap music. Some rappers, such as The Notorious B.I.G., Busta Rhymes, and Heavy D, are of Jamaican descent.

Bob Marley is probably the best known Jamaican musician; with his band The Wailers he had a string of hits in 1960s–70s, popularising reggae internationally and going on to sell millions of records. Many other internationally known artists were born in Jamaica, including Toots Hibbert, Millie Small, Lee "Scratch" Perry, Gregory Isaacs, Half Pint, Protoje, Peter Tosh, Bunny Wailer, Big Youth, Jimmy Cliff, Dennis Brown, Desmond Dekker, Beres Hammond, Beenie Man, Shaggy, Grace Jones, Shabba Ranks, Super Cat, Buju Banton, Sean Paul, I Wayne, Bounty Killer and many others. Bands that came from Jamaica include Black Uhuru, Third World Band, Inner Circle, Chalice Reggae Band, Culture, Fab Five and Morgan Heritage.

Literature

The journalist and author H. G. de Lisser (1878–1944) used his native country as the setting for his many novels. Born in Falmouth, Jamaica, de Lisser worked as a reporter for the Jamaica Times at a young age and in 1920 began publishing the magazine Planters' Punch. The White Witch of Rosehall is one of his better-known novels. He was named Honorary President of the Jamaican Press Association; he worked throughout his professional career to promote the Jamaican sugar industry.

Roger Mais (1905 – 1955), a journalist, poet, and playwright wrote many short stories, plays, and novels, including The Hills Were Joyful Together (1953), Brother Man (1954), and Black Lightning (1955).

Ian Fleming (1908 – 1964), who had a home in Jamaica where he spent considerable time, repeatedly used the island as a setting in his James Bond novels, including Live and Let Die, Doctor No, "For Your Eyes Only", The Man with the Golden Gun, and Octopussy and The Living Daylights. In addition, James Bond uses a Jamaica-based cover in Casino Royale. So far, the only James Bond film adaptation to have been set in Jamaica is Doctor No. Filming for the fictional island of San Monique in Live and Let Die took place in Jamaica.

Marlon James (1970), novelist has published three novels: John Crow's Devil (2005), The Book of Night Women (2009) and A Brief History of Seven Killings (2014), winner of the 2015 Man Booker Prize.

Film

Jamaica has a history in the film industry dating from the early 1960s. A look at delinquent youth in Jamaica is presented in the 1970s musical crime film The Harder They Come, starring Jimmy Cliff as a frustrated (and psychopathic) reggae musician who descends into a murderous crime spree. Other notable Jamaican films include Countryman, Rockers, Dancehall Queen, One Love, Shottas, Out the Gate, Third World Cop and Kingston Paradise. Jamaica is also often used as a filming location, such as the James Bond film Dr. No (1962), Papillon (1973) starring Steve McQueen, Cocktail (1988) starring Tom Cruise, and the 1993 Disney comedy Cool Runnings, which is loosely based on the true story of Jamaica's first bobsled team trying to make it in the Winter Olympics.

Cuisine

The island is famous for its Jamaican jerk spice, curries and rice and peas which is integral to Jamaican cuisine. Jamaica is also home to Red Stripe beer and Jamaican Blue Mountain Coffee.

National symbols
(From the Jamaica Information Service)
 National bird: red-billed streamertail (also called doctor bird) (a hummingbird, Trochilus polytmus)
 National flower – lignum vitae (Guiacum officinale)
 National tree: blue mahoe (Hibiscus talipariti elatum)
 National fruit: ackee (Blighia sapida)
 National motto: "Out of Many, One People."

Sport

Sport is an integral part of national life in Jamaica and the island's athletes tend to perform to a standard well above what might ordinarily be expected of such a small country. While the most popular local sport is cricket, on the international stage Jamaicans have tended to do particularly well at track and field athletics.

Jamaica has produced some of the world's most famous cricketers, including George Headley, Courtney Walsh, Chris Gayle and Michael Holding. The country was one of the venues of 2007 Cricket World Cup and the West Indies cricket team is one of 12 ICC full member teams that participate in international Test cricket. The Jamaica national cricket team competes regionally, and also provides players for the West Indies team. Sabina Park is the only Test venue in the island, but the Greenfield Stadium is also used for cricket. Chris Gayle is the most renowned batsman from Jamaica, currently representing the West Indies cricket team.

Since independence Jamaica has consistently produced world class athletes in track and field. In Jamaica involvement in athletics begins at a very young age and most high schools maintain rigorous athletics programs with their top athletes competing in national competitions (most notably the VMBS Girls and Boys Athletics Championships) and international meets (most notably the Penn Relays). In Jamaica it is not uncommon for young athletes to attain press coverage and national fame long before they arrive on the international athletics stage.

Over the past six decades Jamaica has produced dozens of world class sprinters including Olympic and World Champion Usain Bolt, world record holder in the 100m for men at 9.58s, and 200m for men at 19.19s. Other noteworthy Jamaican sprinters include Arthur Wint, the first Jamaican Olympic gold medalist; Donald Quarrie, Elaine Thompson double Olympic champion from Rio 2016 in the 100m and 200m, Olympic Champion and former 200m world record holder; Roy Anthony Bridge, part of the International Olympic Committee; Merlene Ottey; Delloreen Ennis-London; Shelly-Ann Fraser-Pryce, the former World and two time Olympic 100m Champion; Kerron Stewart; Aleen Bailey; Juliet Cuthbert; three-time Olympic gold medalist; Veronica Campbell-Brown; Sherone Simpson; Brigitte Foster-Hylton; Yohan Blake; Herb McKenley; George Rhoden, Olympic gold medalist; Deon Hemmings, Olympic gold medalist; as well as Asafa Powell, former 100m world record holder and two-time 100m Olympic finalist and gold medal winner in the men's 2008 Olympic . American Olympic winner Sanya Richards-Ross was also born in Jamaica.

Jamaica has also produced several world class amateur and professional boxers including Trevor Berbick and Mike McCallum. First-generation Jamaican athletes have continued to make a significant impact on the sport internationally, especially in the United Kingdom where the list of top British boxers born in Jamaica or of Jamaican parents includes Lloyd Honeyghan, Chris Eubank, Audley Harrison, David Haye, Lennox Lewis and Frank Bruno, Donovan "Razor" Ruddock, Mike Tyson, and Floyd Mayweather Jr., whose maternal grandfather is Jamaican.

Association football and horse-racing are other popular sports in Jamaica. The national football team qualified for the 1998 FIFA World Cup. Horse racing was Jamaica's first sport. It was brought in the 1700s by British immigrants to satisfy their longing for their favorite pastime back at home. During slavery, the Afro-Jamaican slaves were considered the best horse jockeys. Today, horse racing provides jobs for about 20,000 people including horse breeders, groomers, and trainers. Also, several Jamaicans are known internationally for their success in horse racing including Richard DePass, who once held the Guinness Book of World Records for the most wins in a day, Canadian awards winner George HoSang, and American award winners Charlie Hussey, Andrew Ramgeet, and Barrington Harvey. Also, there are hundreds of Jamaicans who are employed in the United States, Canada, and the United Kingdom as exercise riders and groomers.

Race car driving is also a popular sport in Jamaica with several car racing tracks and racing associations across the country.

The Jamaica national bobsled team was once a serious contender in the Winter Olympics, beating many well-established teams. Chess and basketball are widely played in Jamaica and are supported by the Jamaica Chess Federation (JCF) and the Jamaica Basketball Federation (JBF), respectively. Netball is also very popular on the island, with the Jamaica national netball team called The Sunshine Girls consistently ranking in the top five in the world.

Rugby league has been played in Jamaica since 2006.
The Jamaica national rugby league team is made up of players who play in Jamaica and from UK based professional and semi professional clubs (notably in the Super League and Championship). In November 2018 for the first time ever, the Jamaican rugby league team qualified for the Rugby League World Cup after defeating the USA & Canada. Jamaica will play in the 2021 Rugby League World Cup in England.

According to ESPN, the highest paid Jamaican professional athlete in 2011 was Justin Masterson, starting pitcher for the baseball team Cleveland Indians in the United States.

Education

The emancipation of the slaves heralded the establishment of an education system for the masses. Prior to emancipation there were few schools for educating locals and many sent their children off to England to access quality education. After emancipation the West Indian Commission granted a sum of money to establish Elementary Schools, now known as All Age Schools. Most of these schools were established by the churches. This was the genesis of the modern Jamaican school system.

Presently the following categories of schools exist:
 Early childhood – Basic, infant and privately operated pre-school. Age cohort: 2 – 5 years.
 Primary – Publicly and privately owned (privately owned being called preparatory schools). Ages 3 – 12 years.
 Secondary – Publicly and privately owned. Ages 10 – 19 years. The high schools in Jamaica may be either single-sex or co-educational institutions, and many schools follow the traditional English grammar school model used throughout the British West Indies.
 Tertiary – Community colleges; teachers' colleges, with the Mico Teachers' College (now The MICO University College) being the oldest, founded in 1836; the Shortwood Teachers' College (which was once an all-female teacher training institution); vocational training centres, colleges and universities, publicly and privately owned. There are five local universities: the University of the West Indies (Mona Campus); the University of Technology, Jamaica, formerly The College of Art Science and Technology (CAST); the Northern Caribbean University, formerly West Indies College; the University of the Commonwealth Caribbean, formerly the University College of The Caribbean; and the International University of the Caribbean.
Additionally, there are many community and teacher training colleges.

Education is free from the early childhood to secondary levels. There are also opportunities for those who cannot afford further education in the vocational arena, through the Human Employment and Resource Training-National Training Agency (HEART Trust-NTA) programme, which is opened to all working age national population and through an extensive scholarship network for the various universities.

Students are taught Spanish in school from the primary level upwards; about 40–45% of educated people in Jamaica knows some form of Spanish.

Economy

Jamaica is a mixed economy with both state enterprises and private sector businesses. Major sectors of the Jamaican economy include agriculture, mining, manufacturing, tourism, petroleum refining, financial and insurance services. Tourism and mining are the leading earners of foreign exchange. Half the Jamaican economy relies on services, with half of its income coming from services such as tourism. An estimated 4.3 million foreign tourists visit Jamaica every year. According to the World Bank, Jamaica is an upper-middle income country that, like its Caribbean neighbours, is vulnerable to the effects of climate change, flooding, and hurricanes. In 2018, Jamaica represented the CARICOM Caribbean Community at the G20 and the G7 annual meetings. In 2019 Jamaica reported its lowest unemployment rate in 50 years.

Supported by multilateral financial institutions, Jamaica has, since the early 1980s, sought to implement structural reforms aimed at fostering private sector activity and increasing the role of market forces in resource allocation Since 1991, the government has followed a programme of economic liberalisation and stabilisation by removing exchange controls, floating the exchange rate, cutting tariffs, stabilising the Jamaican dollar, reducing inflation and removing restrictions on foreign investment. Emphasis has been placed on maintaining strict fiscal discipline, greater openness to trade and financial flows, market liberalisation and reduction in the size of government. During this period, a large share of the economy was returned to private sector ownership through divestment and privatisation programmes. The free-trade zones at Kingston, Montego Bay and Spanish Town allow duty-free importation, tax-free profits, and free repatriation of export earnings.

Jamaica's economy grew strongly after the years of independence, but then stagnated in the 1980s, due to the heavy falls in price of bauxite and fluctuations in the price of agriculture. The financial sector was troubled in 1994, with many banks and insurance companies suffering heavy losses and liquidity problems. According to the Commonwealth Secretariat, "The government set up the Financial Sector Adjustment Company (Finsac) in January 1997 to assist these banks and companies, providing funds in return for equity, and acquired substantial holdings in banks and insurance companies and related companies..." but it only exasperated the problem, and brought the country into large external debt. From 2001, once it had restored these banks and companies to financial health, Finsac divested them." The Government of Jamaica remains committed to lowering inflation, with a long-term objective of bringing it in line with that of its major trading partners.

In 1996 and 1997 there was a decrease in GDP largely due to significant problems in the financial sector and, in 1997, a severe island-wide drought (the worst in 70 years) and hurricane that drastically reduced agricultural production. In 1997 and 1998, nominal GDP was approximately a high of about 8 percent of GDP and then lowered to 4½ percent of GDP in 1999 and 2000. The economy in 1997 was marked by low levels of import growth, high levels of private capital inflows and relative stability in the foreign exchange market.

Recent economic performance shows the Jamaican economy is recovering. Agricultural production, an important engine of growth increased to 5.5% in 2001 compared to the corresponding period in 2000, signalling the first positive growth rate in the sector since January 1997. In 2018, Jamaica reported a 7.9% increase in corn, 6.1% increase in plantains, 10.4% increase in bananas, 2.2% increase in pineapples, 13.3% increase in dasheen, 24.9% increase in coconuts, and a 10.6% increase in whole milk production. Bauxite and alumina production increased 5.5% from January to December 1998, compared to the corresponding period in 1997. January's bauxite production recorded a 7.1% increase relative to January 1998 and continued expansion of alumina production through 2009 is planned by Alcoa. Jamaica is the fifth-largest exporter of bauxite in the world, after Australia, China, Brazil and Guinea. The country also exports limestone, of which it holds large deposits. The government is currently implementing plans to increase its extraction.

A Canadian company, Carube Copper Corp, has found and confirmed, "...the existence of at least seven significant Cu/Au porphyry systems (in St. Catherine)." They have estimated that, "The porphyry distribution found at Bellas Gate is similar to that found in the Northparkes mining district of New South Wales, Australia (which was) sold to China in 2013 for US$820 million." Carube noted that Jamaica's geology, "... is similar to that of Chile, Argentina and the Dominican Republic – all productive mining jurisdictions." Mining on the sites began in 2017.

Tourism, which is the largest foreign exchange earner, showed improvement as well. In 1999 the total visitor arrivals was 2 million, an increase of 100,000 from the previous year. Since 2017, Jamaica's tourism has risen exponentially, rising to 4.3 million average tourists per year. Jamaica's largest tourist markets are from North America, South America, and Europe. In 2017, Jamaica recorded a 91.3% increase in stopover visitors from Southern and Western Europe (and a 41% increase in stopover arrivals from January to September 2017 over the same period from the previous year) with Germany, Portugal and Spain registering the highest percentage gains. In 2018, Jamaica won several World Travel Awards in Portugal winning the "Chairman's Award for Global Tourism Innovation", "Best Tourist Board in the Caribbean" "Best Honeymoon Destination", "Best Culinary Destination", "World's Leading Beach Destination" and "World's Leading Cruise Destination". Two months later, the Travvy Tourism Awards held in New York City, awarded Jamaica's Tourism Minister Edmund Bartlett, with the inaugural Chairman's Award for, "Global Tourism Innovation for the Development of the Global Tourism Resilience and Crisis Management Centre (GTRCM)". Bartlett has also won the Pacific Travel Writer's Association's award in Germany for the, "2018 Best Tourism Minister of the Year".

Petrojam, Jamaica's national and only petroleum refinery, is co-owned by the Government of Venezuela. Petrojam, "..operates a 35,000 barrel per day hydro-skimming refinery, to produce Automotive Diesel Oil; Heavy Fuel Oil; Kerosene/Jet Fuel, Liquid Petroleum Gas (LPG), Asphalt and Gasoline." Customers include the Power industry, Aircraft refuellers, and Local Marketing companies. On 20 February 2019, the Jamaican Government voted to retake ownership of Venezuela's 49% share.

Jamaica's agricultural exports are sugar, bananas, cocoa, coconut, molasses oranges, limes, grapefruit, rum, yams, allspice (of which it is the world's largest and "most exceptional quality" exporter), and Blue Mountain Coffee which is considered a world renowned gourmet brand.

Jamaica has a wide variety of industrial and commercial activities. The aviation industry is able to perform most routine aircraft maintenance, except for heavy structural repairs. There is a considerable amount of technical support for transport and agricultural aviation. Jamaica has a considerable amount of industrial engineering, light manufacturing, including metal fabrication, metal roofing, and furniture manufacturing. Food and beverage processing, glassware manufacturing, software and data processing, printing and publishing, insurance underwriting, music and recording, and advanced education activities can be found in the larger urban areas. The Jamaican construction industry is entirely self-sufficient, with professional technical standards and guidance.

Since the first quarter of 2006, the economy of Jamaica has undergone a period of staunch growth. With inflation for the 2006 calendar year down to 6.0% and unemployment down to 8.9%, the nominal GDP grew by an unprecedented 2.9%. An investment programme in island transportation and utility infrastructure and gains in the tourism, mining, and service sectors all contributed this figure. All projections for 2007 show an even higher potential for economic growth with all estimates over 3.0% and hampered only by urban crime and public policies. Jamaica was ranked 72nd in the Global Innovation Index in 2020, up from 81st in 2019.

In 2006, Jamaica became part of the CARICOM Single Market and Economy (CSME) as one of the pioneering members.

The global economic downturn had a significant impact on the Jamaican economy for the years 2007 to 2009, resulting in negative economic growth. The government implemented a new Debt Management Initiative, the Jamaica Debt Exchange (JDX) on 14 January 2010. The initiative would see holders of Government of Jamaica (GOJ) bonds returning the high interest earning instruments for bonds with lower yields and longer maturities. The offer was taken up by over 95% of local financial institutions and was deemed a success by the government.

Owing to the success of the JDX program, the Bruce Golding-led government was successful in entering into a borrowing arrangement with the IMF on 4 February 2010 for the amount of US$1.27b. The loan agreement is for a period of three years.

In April 2014, the Governments of Jamaica and China signed the preliminary agreements for the first phase of the Jamaican Logistics Hub (JLH) – the initiative that aims to position Kingston as the fourth node in the global logistics chain, joining Rotterdam, Dubai and Singapore, and serving the Americas. The Project, when completed, is expected to provide many jobs for Jamaicans, Economic Zones for multinational companies and much needed economic growth to alleviate the country's heavy debt-to-GDP ratio. Strict adherence to the IMF's refinancing programme and preparations for the JLH has favourably affected Jamaica's credit rating and outlook from the three biggest rating agencies. In 2018, both Moody's and Standard and Poor Credit ratings upgraded Jamaica's ratings to both "stable and positive" respectively.

Science and technology 
Main articles: Science and technology in Jamaica and List of Jamaican inventions and discoveries

The Science, Technology and Innovation (STI) sector is guided by the National Commission on Science and Technology (NCST) and the Scientific Research Council (SRC). Both are under the direction of the Ministry of Science, Energy, and Technology.

Since the 1990s, the government has set an agenda to push the development of science and technology in Jamaica. Despite some successes, such as the growth of the nutraceutical industry, it has been difficult to translate the results into domestic technologies, products and services - largely because of national budgetary constraints. However, with Jamaica’s improved fiscal space, coming out of its recent IMF programme, the government has pledged to increase expenditure on research and development.

Jamaicans have made some noteworthy scientific and medical contributions. Amongst these include the discovery of kwashiorkor, the pioneer of treatments for pediatric sickle cell anemia and the invention of  various spacecraft support systems.

Infrastructure

Transport

The transport infrastructure in Jamaica consists of roadways, railways and air transport, with roadways forming the backbone of the island's internal transport system.

Roadways

The Jamaican Government has, since the late 1990s and in cooperation with private investors, embarked on a campaign of infrastructural improvement projects, one of which includes the creation of a system of freeways, the first such access-controlled roadways of their kind on the island, connecting the main population centres of the island.

Railways

Railways in Jamaica no longer enjoy the prominent position they once did, having been largely replaced by roadways as the primary means of transport. On 13 April 2011, a limited passenger service was resumed between May Pen, Spanish Town and Linstead.

Air transport

There are three international airports in Jamaica with modern terminals, long runways, and the navigational equipment required to accommodate the large jet aircraft used in modern and air travel: Norman Manley International Airport in Kingston; Ian Fleming International Airport in Boscobel, Saint Mary Parish; and the island's largest and busiest airport, Sir Donald Sangster International Airport in the resort city of Montego Bay. Manley and Sangster International airports are home to the country's national airline, Air Jamaica. In addition there are local commuter airports at Tinson Pen (Kingston), Port Antonio, and Negril, which cater to internal flights only. Many other small, rural centres are served by private airstrips on sugar estates or bauxite mines.

Ports, shipping and lighthouses

Owing to its location in the Caribbean Sea in the shipping lane to the Panama Canal and relative proximity to large markets in North America and emerging markets in Latin America, Jamaica receives much traffic of shipping containers. The container terminal at the Port of Kingston has undergone large expansion in capacity in recent years to handle growth both already realised as well as that which is projected in coming years. Montego Freeport in Montego Bay also handles a variety of cargo like (though more limited than) the Port of Kingston, mainly agricultural products.

There are several other ports positioned around the island, including Port Esquivel in St. Catherine (WINDALCO), Rocky Point in Clarendon, Port Kaiser in St. Elizabeth, Port Rhoades in Discovery Bay, Reynolds Pier in Ocho Rios, and Boundbrook Port in Port Antonio.

To aid the navigation of shipping, Jamaica operates nine lighthouses. They are maintained by the <Port Authority of Jamaica, an agency of the Ministry of Transport and Works.

Energy

Jamaica depends on petroleum imports to satisfy its national energy needs. Many test sites have been explored for oil, but no commercially viable quantities have been found. The most convenient sources of imported oil and motor fuels (diesel, gasoline, and jet fuel) are from Mexico and Venezuela.

Jamaica's electrical power is produced by diesel (bunker oil) generators located in Old Harbour. This facility has been further equipped with liquid natural gas capability and storage. Other smaller power stations (most owned by the Jamaica Public Service Company, the island's electricity provider) support the island's electrical grid including the Hunts Bay Power Station, the Bogue Power Station Saint James, the Rockfort Power Station Saint Andrew and small hydroelectric plants on the White River, Rio Bueno, Morant River, Black River (Maggotty) and Roaring River. A wind farm, owned by the Petroleum Corporation of Jamaica, was established at Wigton, Manchester.

Jamaica has successfully operated a SLOWPOKE-2 nuclear reactor of 20 kW capacity since the early 1980s, but there are no plans to expand nuclear power at present.

Just 20% of imported fuels are used for road transportation, the rest being used by the bauxite industry, electricity generation, and aviation. 30,000 barrels/day of crude imports are processed into various motor fuels and asphalt by the Petrojam Refinery in Kingston.

Jamaica produces enormous quantities of drinking alcohol (at least 5% water content), most of which appears to be consumed as beverages, and none used as motor fuel. Facilities exist to refine hydrous ethanol feedstock into anhydrous ethanol (0% water content), but as of 2007, the process appeared to be uneconomic and the production plant was idle. The facility has since been purchased by West Indies Petroleum Ltd. and repurposed for petroleum distillates.

Communication

Jamaica has a fully digital telephone communication system with a mobile penetration of over 95%.

The country's two mobile operators – FLOW Jamaica (formerly LIME, bMobile and Cable and Wireless Jamaica) and Digicel Jamaica have spent millions in network upgrades and expansion. The newest operator, Digicel was granted a licence in 2001 to operate mobile services in the newly liberalised telecom market that had once been the sole domain of the incumbent FLOW (then Cable and Wireless Jamaica) monopoly. Digicel opted for the more widely used GSM wireless system, while a past operator, Oceanic (which became Claro Jamaica and later merged with Digicel Jamaica in 2011) opted for the CDMA standard. FLOW (formerly "LIME" – pre-Columbus Communications merger) which had begun with TDMA standard, subsequently upgraded to GSM in 2002, decommissioned TDMA in 2006 and only utilised that standard until 2009 when LIME launched its 3G network. Both operators currently provide islandwide coverage with HSPA+ (3G) technology. Currently, only Digicel offers LTE to its customers whereas FLOW Jamaica has committed to launching LTE in the cities of Kingston and Montego Bay, places where Digicel's LTE network is currently only found in, in short order.

A new entrant to the Jamaican communications market, Flow Jamaica, laid a new submarine cable connecting Jamaica to the United States. This new cable increases the total number of submarine cables connecting Jamaica to the rest of the world to four. Cable and Wireless Communications (parent company of LIME) acquired the company in late 2014 and replaced their brand LIME with FLOW. FLOW Jamaica currently has the most broadband and cable subscribers on the island and also has 1 million mobile subscribers, second to Digicel (which had, at its peak, over 2 million mobile subscriptions on its network).

Digicel entered the broadband market in 2010 by offering WiMAX broadband, capable of up to 6 Mbit/s per subscriber. To further their broadband share post-LIME/FLOW merger in 2014, the company introduced a new broadband service called Digicel Play, which is Jamaica's second FTTH offering (after LIME's deployment in selected communities in 2011). It is currently only available in the parishes of Kingston, Portmore and St. Andrew. It offers speeds of up to 200 Mbit/s down, 100 Mbit/s up via a pure fibre optic network. Digicel's competitor, FLOW Jamaica, has a network consisting of ADSL, Coaxial and Fibre to the Home (inherited from LIME) and only offers speeds up to 100 Mbit/s. FLOW has committed to expanding its Fibre offering to more areas in order to combat Digicel's entrance into the market.

It was announced that the Office and Utilities Regulations (OUR), Ministry of Science, Technology, Energy and Mining (MSTEM) and the Spectrum Management Authority (SMA) have given approval for another mobile operator licence in January 2016. The identity of this entrant was ascertained on 20 May 2016, when the Jamaican Government named the new carrier as Symbiote Investments Limited operating under the name Caricel. The company will focus on 4G LTE data offerings and will first go live in the Kingston Metropolitan Area and will expand to the rest of Jamaica thereafter.

See also

 Index of Jamaica-related articles
 List of Jamaicans
 Outline of Jamaica

Notes

References

Further reading

  (pp. 45–83)
 
 Ammar, N. "From Whence they came". Jamaica Journal.
 Bahadur, Gaiutra. Coolie Woman: The Odyssey of Indenture. The University of Chicago (2014), 
 
 
 
 Hall, D. "Bounties European Immigration with Special Reference of the German Settlement at Seaford Town, Parts 1 and 2". Jamaica Journal, 8, (4), 48–54 and 9 (1), 2–9.
 
 Jacobs, H. P. (2003). Germany in Jamaica. Indian heritage in Jamaica. Jamaica Journal, 10, (2,3,4), 10–19,
 
 
 
 
 
 
 The Gleaner. Seaford Town Advertising Feature. 14 August 2003, D7 -D8 .

External links

 Governmental details
 Government of Jamaica
 Jamaica at the Royal Family website
 Official website of the Jamaica Information Service
 The Cabinet Office of the Government of Jamaica 

 Chief of State and Cabinet Members

 General information
 Jamaica. The World Factbook. Central Intelligence Agency.
 Jamaica from UCB Libraries GovPubs
 
 Jamaica from the BBC News
 
 
 National Library of Jamaica materials in the Digital Library of the Caribbean
 JAMAICA VIRTUAL TOUR IN HD – many locations around the island
 Key Development Forecasts for Jamaica from International Futures

 
Greater Antilles
Countries in the Caribbean
Island countries
English Caribbean
English-speaking countries and territories
Former Spanish colonies
Former British colonies
G15 nations
Member states of the Caribbean Community
Member states of the Commonwealth of Nations
Member states of the United Nations
1510 establishments in the Spanish West Indies
1655 disestablishments in the Spanish West Indies
1655 establishments in the British Empire
1962 disestablishments in the British Empire
States and territories established in 1962
Small Island Developing States
1962 establishments in Jamaica
Countries in North America